Spenser: For Hire lasted for three seasons (1985–1988) and was followed by four made-for-TV movies (1993–1995), all starring Robert Urich, and Avery Brooks.

Series overview

Episodes

Season 1 (1985–86)
The two-hour pilot movie was an adaptation of the fourth novel in the book series, Promised Land.

Season 2 (1986–87)

Season 3 (1987–88)

TV movies
During the early 1990s, Urich and Brooks reunited for four made-for-TV films, produced by the Lifetime cable network.   The movies were based on four of Parker's novels. Parker and his wife Joan co-wrote the first two screenplays and the two movies kept to the spirit of the series.  To keep production costs down Barbara Stock was replaced as Susan Silverman in the first two movies by Barbara Williams and in the other two by veteran actress Wendy Crewson (Air Force One) and Frank Belson was played by J. Winston Carroll.  Parker's son Daniel appears in all four movies as a waiter in Spenser's favorite restaurant.  Unlike the series which was filmed in Boston, the new movies were filmed in Toronto to take advantage of the lower production costs.  The first two movies were still set in Boston (parts of Toronto easily passed for Boston), with the second two rewritten to be set in Toronto (the novel Savage Place was set in Los Angeles).

References

Spenser: For Hire